Đorđe Erčević, Nebojša Kundačina, Aleksandar Srećković and Slobodan Ćustić have joined the main cast.

Plot
This is the last season. At the end Saša and Helen marries and Jelena and Vuk reconnect, Ratko is arrested and sent to jail. Sandra and Boban work in agency which is now belongs to Sandra. Sofija marries a rich man.  Gvozden marries Marija a few episodes before the end of the series.

Cast

Episodes

Jelena (TV series)